Council Rock may refer to:
Council Rock (Cooperstown, New York)
Council Rock (Oyster Bay, New York)
Council Rock School District in Bucks County, Pennsylvania.
 Council Rock, New Mexico